Kamal Dennis (born 19 March 1981) is a Jamaican cricketer. He played in one List A match for the Jamaican cricket team in 1999/00.

See also
 List of Jamaican representative cricketers

References

External links
 

1981 births
Living people
Jamaican cricketers
Jamaica cricketers